CHAH, or Chah may refer to:
 Council of Heads of Australasian Herbaria or CHAH:
 Ajahn Chah
CHAH (AM), a multicultural radio station in Edmonton, Alberta.

See also
 Chahe (disambiguation)